Todd Hearon (born ) is an American poet, songwriter, dramatist and fiction writer.  He is the author of three collections of poems -- STRANGE LAND, NO OTHER GODS and CROWS IN EDEN -- a number of plays and essays, and a novella, DO GEESE SEE GOD.  His first full-length studio album is BORDER RADIO, featuring thirteen original songs in the Americana and folk/folk-rock tradition.  He lives in Exeter, New Hampshire and teaches literature and songwriting at Phillips Exeter Academy.

Awards
 Poet-in-Residence, Dartmouth College and The Frost Place
 Dobie-Paisano Creative Writing Fellowship/University of Texas, Austin
 Paul Green Playwrights Prize
 Crab Orchard Award/Southern Illinois University Press
 PEN New England/"Discovery" Award
 Rumi Prize in Poetry/Arts & Letters
 Friends of Literature Prize/Poetry magazine and the Poetry Foundation
 Campbell Corner Poetry Prize/Sarah Lawrence College
 Songwriters Prize, First Place (for Lyrics)/American Songwriter Magazine

Works

Strange Land (Winner of the Crab Orchard Award, judged by Natasha Trethewey, Southern Illinois University Press, 2010)

No Other Gods (Salmon Poetry, 2015)

Crows in Eden (forthcoming, Salmon Poetry, 2022)

DO GEESE SEE GOD (forthcoming, Neutral Zones Press, 2021)

An online selection of poems can be found here:

https://www.poetryfoundation.org/poets/todd-hearon

https://www.memorious.org/?author=27

https://www.thecommononline.org/tag/todd-hearon/

https://agnionline.bu.edu/about/our-people/authors/todd-hearon

https://www.cincinnatireview.com/tag/todd-hearon/

References

External links

https://www.toddhearon.com

https://toddhearon.bandcamp.com/album/border-radio

Year of birth missing (living people)
Living people
American male poets